Puntius kyphus,  is a species of barbs from a stream near Thiruvalla, India.

References

kyphus
Taxa named by Mathews Plamoottil
Fish described in 2019
Fish of India